Ashish Bhadra (born 14 March 1960) is a prominent ex-Bangladeshi footballer. An attacking midfielder, he achieved most of his laurels while playing for Abahani Limited Dhaka in the Dhaka League. He was a big factor in Abahani dominating the Dhaka football scene in the early 1980s. 

He also represented the Bangladesh national team with great distinction and was captain during all six games of the 1986 FIFA World Cup qualifiers. He has scored 5 official international goals for his country.

Early years
Ashish's journey started from school football. In 1976, he played Chittagong First Division League for Kazi Deuri Khawaja Recreation Club. He was the captain of the club in 1977 while still being a college student. Former footballer Iqbal Khan, the father of cricketer Tamim Iqbal, helped him during his time playing in the Chittagong Division. In 1977, he played for Chittagong in a zonal match with Sylhet at the National Football Championship. His team won 3–1, with Ahsish scoring a brace, this performance earned him an invitation to the Dhaka League the following year.

In 1978, Ashish joined Rahmatganj MFS at the age of 18. He performed well during his first league game, which came against Brothers Union, and went on to become an integral part of the team for the following three years. In 1981, he joined Abahani Krira Chakra as the long term replacement for the clubs legendary midfielder and former captain Amalesh Sen.

Success with Abahani
At Abahani, Ashish was part of a formidable midfield duo alongside Khurshid Alam Babul. However, initially the partnership took a bit of time to gel. And in the 1981 Federation Cup final against arch rivals Mohammedan SC, it was Badal Roy, the Mohammedan SC captain who reigned supreme as his team won 2–0. 

But Abahani took revenge in the League match winning 2–0 as the Ashish-Babul combination started to work together well. Abahani clinched the title and remained unbeaten till the very last match of the campaign. With the title already in their grasp, the sky blues lost their final match against Team BJMC 1–0 with Basudev scoring the only goal of the match. Ashish's biggest moment came late in the season when he scored a hattrick against an Indonesia's Persipal Palu in the final edition of the Aga Khan Gold Cup football tournament in Dhaka. The sky blues won the match 5–0. In the 1985–86 Asian Club Championship, Ashish was prolific, he scored a brace against Club Valencia of Maldives, as Abahani won the game 8–1. His third and final goal in the tournament came against Sri Lankan club Saunders SC, in a 4–1 victory.

In 1983, he captained Abahani to the Dhaka League title as unbeaten champions, even after the league committee deducted six points off of his side due to disciplinary reasons. Other than his lone year with Mohammedan SC in 1984, Ashish sepnt the rest of his career at Abahani. He hung up his boots after lifting the domestic league title one last time in 1990. He has 59 goals and 170 assists in his playing career of 20 years.

International career
In 1978 and 1980, Ashish represented the Bangladesh U19 team at the Asian Youth Championships. During the 1978 AFC Youth Championship held in Dhaka, Ahsish scored against Singapore U19 in a 2–2 draw. During the qualifiers for the 1980 AFC Youth Championship, Ashish scored in a 5–1 drubbing of Nepal U19, as Bangladesh qualified for the main tournament, in Bangkok, Thailand. In early 1981, Ashish represented the Bangladesh (Red) team in the first President's Gold Cup in the Dhaka. The red team managed by Bangladesh U19 Gafur Baloch, was mostly made up of players who took part in the Asian Youth Championships the previous year. The team reached the finals after beating a North Korean club in the tie-breaker as the match ended 1–1 in regulation time. Ashish had scored the equaliser for the Red team. Eventually his side lost 2–0 in the final to the South Korean University team. 

After performing well in the Youth Championship in 1978, Ahsish along with many other players from the Bangladesh U19 team were given a chance to play for the senior team at the 1978 Asian Games, by German coach Werner Bickelhaupt. In 1980, Bangladesh coach at the time, Abdur Rahim, also included Ahsish in the squad for the 1980 AFC Asian Cup. His first goal for the senior team came during a 2–1 win over Malaysia, at the 1982 Asian Games. This was Bangladesh's first victory at the Asian Games, with Badal Roy scoring the all-important goal. Ashish remained an integral part of the national team throughout the 80s alongside his midfield partner for club and country, Khurshid Alam Babul. In the summer of 1985, he was elected as the national team captain for the 1986 FIFA World Cup qualifiers, and scored the opening goal at the Salt Lake Stadium, Kolkata, against India during their last qualifying match. Nonetheless, the Indians, eventually won 2–1.

Internatioanl goals

Bangladesh U19

Bangladesh national team

Awards
In 2012, Ashish was awarded the national sports award for his outstanding contribution to Bangladesh football.

Honours

Abahani Krira Chakra
 Dhaka League =  1981, 1983, 1985, 1989–90
 Federation Cup = 1982, 1985, 1986, 1988
 Independence Cup = 1990
 Sait Nagjee Trophy = 1989

Mohammedan SC
 Dhaka League =  1984

Awards and accolades
 National Sports Award = 2012

References

External links 
 

Bangladeshi footballers
Bangladesh international footballers
Bangladesh youth international footballers
Living people
1960 births
People from Chittagong
Bangladeshi Hindus
Recipients of the Bangladesh National Sports Award
Asian Games competitors for Bangladesh
Footballers at the 1978 Asian Games
Footballers at the 1982 Asian Games
Footballers at the 1986 Asian Games
1980 AFC Asian Cup players
Abahani Limited (Dhaka) players
Rahmatganj MFS players
Mohammedan SC (Dhaka) players
Association football midfielders